HMS Galatea (F18) was a  of the Royal Navy. She was built by Swan Hunter & Wigham on the Tyne. She was launched on 23 May 1963 and commissioned on 25 April 1964 and was the eighth ship of the Royal Navy to bear the name.

First deployments
Upon her commission, Galatea was immediately stationed in the Mediterranean Sea. The following year, Galatea was involved in exercises in that region, and in 1966 joined the 27th Escort Group which were also based in the Mediterranean. Later that year, Galatea returned to United Kingdom waters when she joined the Home Fleet. In the same year she took part in Portsmouth 'Navy Days'.

Refitting and Cod Wars
In 1971, Galatea began a period of refit and modernisation, which included the installation of the Ikara and Sea Cat weapons systems. The refit was completed in 1974.  The following year, Galatea was engaged in operations during the Third Cod War with Iceland, patrolling against possible Icelandic interference with British fishing trawlers. On 26 March 1976, Galatea collided with the stern of the Icelandic Coast Guard vessel  , damaging the frigate's bow.

Galateas last decade
In 1977, Galatea underwent a refit after participating in a Fleet Review, in honor of Queen Elizabeth II's Silver Jubilee. Galatea, leader of the 1st Frigate Squadron, was positioned between her sister ship  and the cruiser .

In 1978, Galatea returned to the Mediterranean, where a number of patrols and exercises were undertaken. Much of 1980 was spent in the Far East, but a planned nine-month deployment ended with the start of the Iran–Iraq War. In 1981, Galatea refitted in Gibraltar before deploying to the Persian Gulf on Armilla Patrol, where she remained until about 1983. The frigate decommissioned in January 1987 and was sunk as a target in July 1988, as part of naval exercises in the North Atlantic.

Commanding officers

Notable commanding officers include Henry Leach from 1965 to 1967 and Anthony (Tony) John Cooke between 1969 and 1971.

References

Publications
 
 Jackson, Robert "Fighting Ships of The World." London: Amber Books Ltd, 2004 Pg. 277 
 Marriott, Leo, 1983.  Royal Navy Frigates 1945-1983, Ian Allan Ltd.  

 

Leander-class frigates
1963 ships
Ships of the Fishery Protection Squadron of the United Kingdom
Ships built by Swan Hunter